Yudelka Tapia (born November 9, 1963) is an American politician who is currently representing the 86th district in the New York State Assembly since 2021.

Early life and education 
Tapia was born in Santo Domingo, Dominican Republic. Raised in what she described as "a family of organizers", Tapia described her father as "a revolutionary" who "fought in the civil war against the invasion of the Yankees in 1965."

Tapia became involved in social activism at O&M College, where she founded and led the Unión Democrática de Mujeres as the group's president. She immigrated to the United States at age 19, settling in the West Bronx, and attended Bronx Community College in the 1990s. Tapia later earned a master’s degree in urban policy and leadership from Hunter College.

Career 
Tapia worked as an auditor for the City of New York for 23 years. She served as a local Democratic district leader and as president of the parent teacher association at Theodore Roosevelt High School.

In the 2021 New York City Council election, Tapia unsuccessfully ran to represent the 14th district, losing to Pierina Sanchez.

Following assemblyman Victor Pichardo's resignation announcement, Tapia announced her candidacy to replace him. Tapia was nominated as the candidate of the Democratic Party and won the special election to succeed Pichardo. Tapia has endorsed Kathy Hochul's campaign in the 2022 gubernatorial election.

Personal life 
Tapia is the mother of four children.

References 

American politicians of Dominican Republic descent
Dominican Republic emigrants to the United States
Living people
New York (state) Democrats
Hispanic and Latino American women in politics
21st-century American politicians
Politicians from the Bronx
Hispanic and Latino American state legislators in New York (state)
Hunter College alumni
Bronx Community College alumni
1963 births